The 2013 China Women's Sevens was the first edition of the China Women's Sevens tournament, and the third of four tournaments in the 2012–13 IRB Women's Sevens World Series. New Zealand won the final, defeating England by 19–5.

Format 
Teams are drawn into three pools of four teams each. Each team plays every other team in their pool once. The top two teams from each pool advance to the Cup/Plate brackets along with the top two third place teams. The rest of the teams go to the Bowl bracket

Teams 
A total of twelve teams competed, the six "core" teams and six invited teams.

Core Teams
 
 
 
 
 
 

Invited Teams

Pool Stage

Pool A

Pool B

Pool C

Knockout stage

Bowl

Plate

Cup

References

2012–13
2012–13 IRB Women's Sevens World Series
rugby union
2013 in women's rugby union
2013 rugby sevens competitions
2013 in Asian rugby union